The 2014 1. deild karla (English: Men's First Division) was the 60th season of second-tier Icelandic football. Twelve teams contested the league; play began on 9 May and was concluded on 20 September. Leiknir R were crowned champions on 20. Sept 2014 for the first time and earned their first ever promotion to Úrvalsdeild.

Teams
The league will be contested by twelve clubs. Eight remained in the division from the 2013 season, while four new clubs joined the 1. deild karla:
 ÍA and Víkingur Ólafsvík were relegated from the 2013 Úrvalsdeild, replacing Fjölnir and Víkingur Reykjavík who were promoted to the 2014 Úrvalsdeild
 HK and KV were promoted from the 2013 2. deild karla, in place of KF and Völsungur who were relegated to the 2014 2. deild karla

Club information

League table

Results grid
Each team plays every opponent once home and away for a total of 22 matches per club, and 132 matches altogether.

Top goalscorers

References

1. deild karla (football) seasons
Iceland
Iceland
2